Claire Allen (July 29, 1853 – December 22, 1942) was an American architect prominent in southern Michigan in the early twentieth century, and best known for designing several county courthouses. He was considered a "master regional architect".

Allen moved to Jackson as a young man, and practiced architecture there for 52 years. He established the architectural firm of Claire Allen & Sons. Some 100 structures are attributed to him. His firm designed numerous examples of American neoclassical architecture and colonial revival buildings in Michigan and Iowa, but had a range that encompassed Beaux-Arts Classical and Jacobean Revival style as well.

Works
Some buildings designed by Allen include:

Maps
Claire Allen Buildings in Chelsea, Michigan
Claire Allen Buildings in Jackson, Michigan
Claire Allen Buildings in Michigan
Claire Allen Buildings in Iowa

External links
Photos
Photos

Books
Buildings in Jackson
Buildings of Michigan
Ionia County, Michigan
Illustrations of a few public and private buildings, the work of Claire Allen, architect.
Our Hometown: America's History, As Seen Through the Eyes of a Midwestern Village
Lansing
Traveling Through Time
The wondrous works of Claire Allen, architect

Web Articles
Information about Claire Allen
Jackson Downtown Survey - pdf
Grand Ledge History

References

1853 births
1942 deaths
Architects from Michigan
People from Pontiac, Michigan
19th-century American architects
20th-century American architects